Serafin Gabriel (October 12, 1928 – February 9, 1992), better known by his stage name Apeng Daldal, was a Filipino actor, comedian, vaudevillian, singer and writer. His name came from his big set of teeth (Apeng) and for being a fast talker (Daldal).

Later life
As an actor, Apeng Daldal performed in movies such as Magic Bilao, released in 1965, Dobol Dribol (1979), and Libis ng Baryo (1964). Apeng Daldal's songs include "Sa Loob ng Sine" (Tagalog adaptation for The Music Played) and Magpapatuka nalang ako sa ahas.

Death
Apeng died on February 9, 1992, in Manila, Philippines.

Filmography

Movies
Kamakalawa (1981) 
Dobol Dribol (1979) 
The Son of Dyango Meets Dorango Kid (1967) 
Langit Pa Rin Kita (1967) 
The Pogi Dozen (1967) 
Pitong James Bonds (1966) 
Tatlong Mabilis (1965) as Apenger 
Magic Bilao (1965) 
Maskulado (1965) 
Tatlong Mabilis sa Hong Kong (1965) 
Babaing Kidlat (1964) 
Libis ng Baryo (1964) 
Mga Daliring Ginto (1964) 
Alias Golden Boy (1963)

Television
Tunay Na Buhay (GMA 7, 2015) - posthumously featured
Sabado Badoo (GMA 7, 2015) - posthumously featured 
MMK (ABS-CBN 2, 1991) - his last TV appearance 
Cafeteria Aroma (RPN 9, 1991-1992)
Love Me Doods (PTV 4, 1990-1992)
Estudyante Blues (PTV 4, 1990-1992)
Barrio Balimbing (RPN 9, 1988-1989)
Hapi House (IBC 13, 1988-1989) - guest
Ang Manok Ni San Pedro (RPN 9, 1988-1989)
Okay Ka Fairy Ko (IBC 13, 1987-1989)
Plaza 1899 (RPN 9, 1987-1988)
Kalatog Pinggan (ABS-CBN 2, 1987-1989)
UFO: Urbano, Felicia & Others The Sitcom (GMA 7, 1985-1986)
Lovingly Yours Helen (GMA 7, 1984-1992)
Champoy (RPN 9, 1981-1985)
Principe Abante (GMA 7, 1979-1980)
Baltic & Co. The Sitcom (GMA 7, 1977-1978)
Iskul Bukol (IBC 13, 1978-1990)
Chicks To Chicks (IBC 13, 1979-1987)
John En Marsha (RPN 9, 1973-1990)

References

External links

1928 births
1992 deaths
20th-century Filipino male actors
Filipino male comedians
Filipino male silent film actors
Filipino male stage actors
Vaudeville performers
Male actors from Pampanga
20th-century comedians
Filipino male film actors